John R. Cloutier (born November 15, 1957) is an American politician in the state of New Hampshire. He is a member of the New Hampshire House of Representatives, sitting as a Democrat from the Sullivan 10 district, having been first elected in 1992.

References

1957 births
Living people
People from Claremont, New Hampshire
Democratic Party members of the New Hampshire House of Representatives
Keene State College alumni
20th-century American politicians
21st-century American politicians